The 1995–96 UMass Minutemen basketball team represented the University of Massachusetts Amherst during the 1995–96 NCAA Division I men's basketball season. The Minutemen, led by eighth year head coach John Calipari, played their home games at William D. Mullins Memorial Center and were members of the Atlantic 10 Conference. They finished the season 35–2, 15–1 in A-10 play to finish in first place. The Minutemen won the A-10 Conference tournament by beating Temple in the finals. They were awarded a #1 seed in the NCAA tournament. The Minutemen advanced to the Final Four, losing to eventual National Champion, Kentucky.

On May 8, 1997, the NCAA Executive Committee voted to negate the Minutemen's 1996 NCAA Tournament record, for Marcus Camby's acceptance of agents' improper gifts. The 35–2 record was reduced to 31–1, and the UMass slot in the Final Four is officially marked as "vacated." The Final Four trophy, banner, and 45% of tournament revenue were returned to the NCAA. Camby reimbursed the school for the $151,617 in lost revenue.

Roster

Schedule

|-
!colspan=9 style=| Non-conference regular season

|-
!colspan=9 style=| Atlantic 10 regular season

|-
!colspan=9 style=| Atlantic 10 tournament

|-
!colspan=9 style=| NCAA tournament

Rankings

Awards and honors
 Marcus Camby – National Player of the Year, Consensus First-team All-American, A-10 Player of the Year
 Edgar Padilla – Honorable Mention AP All-American
 John Calipari – Naismith College Coach of the Year, NABC Coach of the Year

Team players in the 1996 NBA draft

References

UMass Minutemen basketball seasons
UMass
NCAA Division I men's basketball tournament Final Four seasons
Umass